District 13 is a United States Coast Guard district, based at the Henry M. Jackson Federal Building, in Seattle, Washington. It covers the Pacific Northwest and its Area of Responsibility encompasses four states; Washington, Oregon, Idaho, and Montana. District 13 is divided into three Sectors – Puget Sound, Columbia River and North Bend. The District has more than 3,000 active duty and reserve members, civilian employees, and auxiliaries and operates twenty-one cutters, 132 boats and eleven aircraft.

Command and duties
District 13's assets carry out an array of daily operations including search and rescue, coastal patrols to enforce safety and fisheries regulations, conduct safety and compliance inspections, examine commercial vessels and waterfront facilities, and protect strategic defense and critical infrastructure. The District also contains the United States largest domestic ferry system, as well as the third largest domestic port, the third largest cruise ship port, and the largest grain export gateway in the country. District 13 also provides support and ports to various Coast Guard Pacific Area assets, including two high endurance cutters, three medium endurance cutters, two icebreakers, a Port Security Unit, Maritime Safety and Security Team, and Base Seattle.

District 13 is commanded by Rear Admiral Melvin Bouboulis.

District 13 Units
District 13
Thirteenth Coast Guard District HQ, Jackson Federal Building, Seattle, Washington
USCGC Elm WLB-204, Base Tongue Point, Astoria, Oregon
, Naval Station Everett, Everett, Washington

Sector Puget Sound
USCG Station Seattle, Seattle, Washington
Sector Puget Sound HQ
Aids to Navigation Team Puget Sound
Puget Sound Vessel Traffic Service
Marine Safety Office Puget Sound
USCG Station Quillayute River, La Push, Washington
USCG Station Port Angeles, Port Angeles, Washington
Sector Field Office (SFO) Port Angeles
USCGC Adelie (WPB-87333)
USCGC Swordfish (WPB-87358)
USCGC Wahoo (WPB-87345)
USCGC Cuttyhunk (WPB-1322)
USCG Station Bellingham, Bellingham, Washington
USCGC Sea Lion (WPB-87352)
USCGC Terrapin (WPB-87366)
USCG Station Neah Bay, Neah Bay, Washington
USCGC Blueshark (WPB-87360), Naval Station Everett, Everett, Washington
USCGC Osprey (WPB-87307), Port Townsend, Washington
Maritime Force Protection Unit Bangor, Naval Base Kitsap-Bangor, Silverdale, Washington

Sector Columbia River
Sector Columbia River HQ, Warrenton, Oregon
USCG Station Cape Disappointment, Ilwaco, Washington
National Motor Lifeboat School
USCG Station Grays Harbor, Westport, Washington
USCG Station Portland, Portland, Oregon
Marine Safety Office/Group Portland

USCG Station Tillamook Bay, Garibaldi, Oregon
Aids to Navigation Team Astoria, Astoria, OR
Aids to Navigation Team Kennewick, Kennewick, Washington

Sector North Bend
Sector North Bend HQ, North Bend, Oregon
USCG Station Chetco River, Harbor, Oregon
USCG Station Coos Bay, Charleston, Oregon
Aids to Navigation Team Coos Bay
USCGC Orcas (WPB-1327)
USCG Station Depoe Bay, Newport, Oregon
USCG Station Siuslaw River, Florence, Oregon
USCG Station Umpqua River, Winchester Bay, Oregon
USCG Station Yaquina Bay, Newport, Oregon

PACAREA Units

USCG Base Seattle, Seattle, Washington
Maritime Safety and Security Team (MSST) 91101, Seattle
Port Security Unit 313, Tacoma, Washington
, Seattle 
, Seattle (Out of service since 2010, and now provides spare parts for Polar Star.)
, Seattle
, Seattle
, Seattle
, Port Angeles, Washington
, Warrenton, Oregon
, Warrenton
 
HQ Units
Facilities Design & Construction Center, Seattle, Washington
Investigation Services Northwest, Seattle
USCG Recruiting Offices
Tukwila, Washington 
Vancouver, Washington 
Boise, Idaho
Regional Exam Centers
Seattle, Washington 
Portland, Oregon

Training
Not only does the 13th deal with the nation's largest amount of recreational traffic, but it is also home to one of only two Maritime Force Protection Units, which are responsible for escorting America's Trident ballistic-missile submarines to and from their home port. It is also the home of the National Motor Lifeboat School near Coast Guard Station Cape Disappointment in Ilwaco, Washington. The Advanced Helicopter Rescue School across the Columbia River teaches extreme rescue scenarios at the Tongue Point and Air Station in Astoria, Oregon.

References

United States Coast Guard districts